Escort is the first album by an American nu-disco band Escort. Rolling Stone ranked it 40th on its list of the top 50 albums of 2012.

Track listing

References

2011 debut albums
Escort (band) albums